Noah Juulsen (born April 2, 1997) is a Canadian ice hockey defenceman. He is currently playing for the  Vancouver Canucks of the National Hockey League (NHL). Juulsen was drafted 26th overall by the Montreal Canadiens at the 2015 NHL Entry Draft.

Playing career

Junior
Juulsen was drafted by the Everett Silvertips in the fourth round of the 2012 Western Hockey League (WHL) Bantam Draft. During the 2014–15 WHL season his outstanding play was rewarded when he was selected to play in the 2015 CHL/NHL Top Prospects Game. During the 2015 NHL Entry Draft, the Montreal Canadiens selected Juulsen 26th overall. On July 9, 2015, Juulsen agreed to terms on a three-year, entry- level contract with the Canadiens.

Professional
Juulsen made his professional debut during the 2017–18. On February 21, 2018, Juulsen was recalled by the Canadiens and played his first NHL game on February 22, 2018, in a 3–1 win against the New York Rangers. On March 2, Juulsen scored his first career NHL goal during a 6-3 win over the New York Islanders. He recorded an additional two assists in 23 total games for the club.

On February 1, 2019, the Canadiens announced Juulsen was out indefinitely with a vision-related issue following twin puck strikes to the face during the November 19, 2018 match against the Washington Capitals. He skated in a total of 21 games for the Canadiens during the 2018–19 season, scoring one goal and four assists.

On January 11, 2021, the Florida Panthers claimed Juulsen off of waivers from the Canadiens.

Prior to the commencement of the  season, on October 10, 2021, Juulsen was traded by the Panthers to the Vancouver Canucks, along with Juho Lammikko, in exchange for Olli Juolevi.

International play

Juulsen competed with Team Canada Pacific to win a silver medal at the 2014 World U-17 Hockey Challenge.

Career statistics

Regular season and playoffs

International

Awards and honours

References

External links 

1997 births
Living people
Abbotsford Canucks players
Canadian ice hockey defencemen
Canadian people of Danish descent
Everett Silvertips players
Florida Panthers players
Ice hockey people from British Columbia
Laval Rocket players
Montreal Canadiens draft picks
Montreal Canadiens players
National Hockey League first-round draft picks
St. John's IceCaps players
Syracuse Crunch players
Vancouver Canucks players